DIAN Racing  is the Formula Student Electric team from  Tongji University. Every year, the team designs and builds a cutting-edge electric race car to compete at international Formula Student events. DIAN Racing was established in March 2013 under the tuition of Godert Van Hardenbroek and built the fifth race car in 2017.  The team competed in several events in China and in Japan.

DIAN Racing Tongji University is affiliated to the School of Automotive Studies of Tongji University and the Clean Energy Center of Automotive Engineering of Tongji University. The team faculty advisor is Professor Dr.-Ing Zhang Tong, dean of Clean Energy Automotive Engineering Center. The team captains were Yin Jun (2013), Qiwen Xiao (2014), Juncong Fei (2015), Ma Jiajun (2016), Ma Ruisheng (2017). Xiao Hongyu and Wu Wei are leading DIAN Racing since the season 2018.
The team consists of three departments, namely the Management Department, the Commercial Department and the Engineering Department.

Technical highlights

DRe17 Arrangement 
In 2017, the DIAN Racing designed a high downforce aerodynamic package. For compensating pitch and allowing a finer suspension adjustment, the suspension of DRe17 made use of a 3 spring-damper system.

DRe13 Arrangement

DRe14 Arrangement

Team history 
2014 FSC（Formula Student China）
On October 12, 2014, DIAN Racing team left for Xiangyang city in Hubei Province to participate in Formula Student China. In commercial report, we got 3rd place in design report in electric racecar, 11th place in marketing report, 19th place in cost report; On the track, we got 4th place in linear acceleration, 4th place in “8”cycling and 13th in high-speed obstacle avoidance.

2014 Chinese National Racing Team and Tongji University developed electric formula racecar together.
 On July 9th 2014, Mr. Lv Yang ,deputy president of Chinese National Racing Team, and Prof. Zhang Tong, the dean of Clear energy Automotive Engineering Center of Tongji University signed a strategic cooperation frame agreement ,aimed at engineering talents and the development of frontier power systems.
2014 "• DIAN, we are ready’" the Roll-out Event.
 On the afternoon of the ninth of July 2014, the ‘DIAN, we are ready’ DIAN Racing roll out event, the DRe14 car was unveiled in the Shanghai Auto Museum, receiving universal praise from the audience.
2014 Signing Ceremony with Volkswagen, China 
 On May 14, 2014, DIAN Racing held a signing ceremony with Volkswagen China in Clear Energy Automotive Engineering Center. The cooperative relationship for this season was established.
 2014  DIAN Racing Car body Design Competition Award Ceremony 
 March 22, 2014, DIAN Racing Car body Design Competition Award Ceremony was held at Sino-Finnish Centre in Tongji University. Dr.Katharina Seifert from Volkswagen, Mr. Xie Hongwan and Ms. Chen Jieyu, two designers from Das sault systems, the Faculty Director of School of Design and Innovation, Prof. Lou Yongqi were invited to come.
2013 DIAN Tongji Racing Team Sponsor Annual Meeting
 On December 19, 2013, DIAN Racing held Sponsor Annual Meeting in the exhibition hall on the 1st floor of Clear Energy Automotive Engineering Center. Professor Zhang Tong, team Advisor Mr. Song Ke, as well as team advisor Godert van Hardenbroek attended and communicated with more than 20 suppliers from 15 companies.
2013 DRe13 was born.
Early in October 2013, DIAN Racing welcomed a new electric car. From the initial conception of the frame, members of engineering department continue debugging step by step and figure out the problem in driveline, steering, motor based on the specific knowledge. Furthermore, the smooth modeling is also the efforts by the designers. This car is built with heart and carries our sweat, laughter and an ambitious experience. 
 2013 Car body Design Competition Award Ceremony 
 On January 13, 2013, the advisor Godert van Hardenbroek announced the winners in 2012-DIAN Racing Car body Design Competition.

Team Culture
The new logo is composed by a “电（electricity）”in traditional Chinese character and the bilingual team name. The color of ”电”was red, grand and clear-cut. The Chinese name is newly added after the discussion and vote among the whole team. The team is aimed at becoming an international team which has English name first, but as a team from China, the Chinese name is also crucial.”同济电车队”simply demonstrates that we are a formula student team from Tongji University; When it comes to our English name,” DIAN Racing" is inspired by the pronunciation of "电"in Chinese, taking both domestic and abroad influences into consideration, which shows our team was founded in China and aimed at the world.

References

Formula SAE
Motorsport in China
Tongji University